Feel My Soul is the debut album by singer Jennifer Holliday, released in October 1983 on Geffen Records. The album reached No. 6  on the Billboard Top Soul Albums chart and No. 31 on the Top Albums chart. Feel My Soul was Grammy nominated within the category of Best R&B Vocal Performance, Female.

Overview
Feel My Soul was produced by Maurice White, founder and leader of the funk band Earth, Wind and Fire.

Track listing

Personnel
Jennifer Holliday - lead vocals, backing vocals
Crystal Wilson, Jeanette Hawes, Maurice White, Wanda Vaughn (aka "The Cornbread Choir") - backing vocals
Caleb Quaye,  Carlos Rios - guitar
Roland Bautista - guitar Solo on track 3
Nathan East - bass
Bill Meyers, David Foster, Edwin Hawkins, Wayne Vaughn - keyboards
Robbie Buchanan - synthesizers, synth solo on track 1
Greg Phillinganes - synthesizers and synth solo on track 7
Fred White, Ricky Lawson - drums
Paulinho Da Costa - percussion
Maurice White and Wanda Vaughn - backing vocal arrangements 
Bill Meyers - string and horn arrangements on tracks 1-3, 7 
Jerry Hey - horn arrangements on tracks 4, 5, 8 
Jeremy Lubbock - string arrangements on tracks 4 and 9

Charts

Weekly charts

Year-end charts

Singles

References

1983 debut albums
Jennifer Holliday albums
Albums produced by Maurice White
Geffen Records albums